The Pan American Softball Stadium is a softball stadium located in Guadalajara, Mexico.  The stadium was opened in May 2010,  and has a capacity of 792 spectators.   The stadium was built to host the softball competition at the 2011 Pan American Games.  It also hosted the 2010 Mexican National Olympics, and after the Pan American Games it will be used to host youth baseball and softball tournaments.   The stadium has received very favourable reviews from both the United States women's national softball team and the president of the International Softball Federation.

See also
 Softball at the 2011 Pan American Games

References

External links
 Profile

2010 establishments in Mexico
Sports venues in Guadalajara, Jalisco
Venues of the 2011 Pan American Games